Wednesday's Luck is a 1936 British crime film directed by George Pearson and starring Wilson Coleman, Susan Bligh, Patrick Barr and Moore Marriott.

Premise
A detective goes undercover to infiltrate a gang of criminals.

Cast
 Wilson Coleman - Stevens
 Susan Bligh - Sheila
 Patrick Barr - Jim Carfax
 Moore Marriott - Nobby
 Paul Neville - Waddington
 Linden Travers - Mimi
 George Dewhurst - Wood

References

External links

1936 films
1930s English-language films
Films directed by George Pearson
1936 crime films
British crime films
Films produced by Anthony Havelock-Allan
British black-and-white films
British and Dominions Studios films
Films shot at Imperial Studios, Elstree
1930s British films